This list of Fairfax County Public Schools middle schools encompasses public middle schools operated by the Fairfax County Public Schools school district of Virginia, United States.

One middle school, Johnson Middle School, is located in the city of Fairfax. The others are located in incorporated and unincorporated areas in Fairfax County.

Carson Middle School

Rachel Carson Middle School is a middle school in Herndon, Virginia. Carson Middle School is located in Region 1 and feeds into Oakton High School.  The school serves students in grades 7 and 8.

History 
Planning for a new middle school began in 1994 when the Fairfax County School Board when discussions began for land acquisition in western Fairfax County for a middle school site. The school was originally designed to house 1,250 students.

On May 14, 1998, the Fairfax County School Board voted to name the school after Rachel Carson, an environmentalist and author. Carl Sagan was also one of the finalists as a name for the school.

Carson Middle School was first opened on September 8, 1998 with Gail Womble as the first principal. The school's mascot is the panther, which was chosen by the student body.

Administration 
The current principal of Rachel Carson Middle School is Gordon Stokes. Before being appointed in 2015, Stokes was an assistant principal at South County Middle School and Luther Jackson Middle School and also taught as a History teacher at RCMS in its first few years.

Academics 
Rachel Carson Middle School is an Advanced Academic Placement (AAP) Center. The school has a wide range of electives to choose from and a large fine and performing arts program. Carson Middle School offers Spanish, French, Chinese, and Japanese foreign language classes.

Demographics 
As of the 2020–21 school year, Carson Middle School has a total of 1,473 students. The school is:

 49.29% Asian
 26% White
 9.1% Hispanic or Latino
 8.55% Black
 7.06% Other

Feeder Pattern 
Carson Middle School is a magnet school, and feeds into four high schools: Chantilly, Oakton, Westfield, and South Lakes.

Elementary schools that feed into RCMS include Oak Hill, Floris, Coates, Crossfield, Navy, McNair, Lees Corner, and Fox Mill.

Cooper Middle School

James Fenimore Cooper Middle School is a middle school in McLean, Virginia. Cooper Middle School is located in Region 1 and feeds into Langley High School. The school serves students in grades 7 and 8.

History 
In 1958, Fairfax County began creating intermediate schools to create a smooth transition between elementary and high school. In 1959, Intermediate School #2 was officially named after American writer James Fenimore Cooper. Construction on Cooper Intermediate School began in December 1961, and opened its doors to students on September 4, 1962, as schools in Fairfax County were integrating. The school's inaugural principal was William D. McKinney. In 1990, Cooper Intermediate became Cooper Middle School. The school was renovated in 1968 and is set to be renovated again in 2022. The school's mascot is the Cougar.

Administration 
The current principal of Cooper Middle School is Lisa Barrow. Before being appointed principal in 2020, Barrow was the Director of Professional Growth and Career Development in the Office of Professional Learning and Family Engagement for Fairfax County Public Schools. She also was the principal of Sleepy Hollow Elementary School, and the assistant principal at both Marshall Road Elementary School and Frost Middle School.

Academics 
James Fenimore Cooper Middle School is an Advanced Academic Placement (AAP) Center. Cooper Middle School offers Spanish, French, Japanese, and German foreign language classes.

Demographics 
As of the 2020–21 school year, Cooper Middle School has a total of 936 students. The school is:
 52.35% White
 30.77% Asian
7.59% Other
 6.73% Hispanic or Latino
 2.56% Black

Feeder Pattern 
This is the current feeding pattern of Cooper Middle School.

Langley High School

 James Fenimore Cooper Middle School
 Churchill Road Elementary School
 Colvin Road Elementary School
 Forestville Elementary School
 Great Falls Elementary School
 Spring Hill Elementary School

Franklin Middle School
Benjamin Franklin Middle School is a middle school in Chantilly, Virginia. Franklin Middle School is located in Region 5 and feeds into Chantilly High School. The school serves students in grades 7 and 8.

History 
Franklin Middle School opened in the fall of 1984 as an intermediate school with the theme “We touch the Future Through the Past and Present.” In the 1990s ,Franklin Intermediate became Franklin Middle. The school was named for Benjamin Franklin, and their mascot is the falcons.

Administration 
The current principal of Franklin Middle School is Dustin Wright. Before being appointed principal in 2020, Wright was the principal of Olde Creek Elementary School. He also served as the assistant principal of Daniels Run Elementary School and Fairfax Villa Elementary School, as well as a band director at Carson Middle School.

Academics 
Franklin Middle School has been a Governor's School of Educational Excellence since 2007. Franklin Middle School offers Spanish, French, Japanese, and Chinese foreign language classes

Demographics 
As of the 2020–21 school year, Franklin Middle School has a total of 899 students. The school is:
 44.94% White
 26.25% Asian
 14.91% Hispanic or Latino
7.45% Other
 6.45% Black

Feeder Pattern 
Franklin Middle School feeds into two high schools: Chantilly High School and Oakton High School

Elementary schools that feed into Franklin include Brookfield, Greenbriar East, Lees Corner, and Oak Hill

Frost Middle School

Frost Middle School (Region 5, grades 7–8) is a public school named after the poet Robert Frost and located southeast of Fairfax.

Most students feed into Frost from Fairfax Villa Elementary School, Oak View Elementary School, Olde Creek Elementary School, Little Run Elementary School, Canterbury Woods Elementary School, Wakefield Forest Elementary School, Mantua Elementary School, Annandale Terrace Elementary School, Braddock Elementary School, and North Springfield Elementary School. Not all students from these schools attend Frost.

Most students feed into W. T. Woodson High School for grades 9–12, but some feed into Annandale High School or Falls Church High School. Every year (as of 2021), around 21 students test into Thomas Jefferson High School for Science and Technology. 

Frost had 1154 students during the 2015–2016 school year. During the same school year, 12.13% of the student body received free/reduced-priced meals, and 5.03% were classified as having limited English.

Frost has a AAP center (FCPS Advanced Academic Program). There are eight teams at Frost: four in the seventh grade (Cavaliers, Voyagers, Endeavor, Travelers) and four in the eighth grade (Atoms, Explorers, Galaxy, Seekers). Travelers, Cavaliers, Galaxy, and Seekers are in the AAP, while Voyagers, Endeavor, Atoms, and Explorers are not.

Frost Middle School was recognized with the Governor's Award of Excellence from 2010 through 2017, and with the Virginia Board of Education Distinguished Achievement Award in 2013. In 2013 the school was recognized with the G.O.L.D.E.N. Wellness Award, as well as the Healthier U.S. School Challenge Bronze Award. The Virginia Music Educators' Association awarded Frost Middle School their Blue Ribbon from 2009 through 2017. Frost has been frequently ranked among the best middle schools in Virginia.

As with many other middle schools in the area, chorus, orchestra and band classes take a trip to an amusement park, such as Busch Gardens or Kings Dominion near the end of the year.

Extracurricular activities occur every day, with late buses offered on Monday, Tuesday, Wednesday, and Thursday. Students have the option to stay after school on Fridays, but they must have a ride home. Activities include:

 Anime Club
 Art Club
 Boardgame Club
 Book Club
 Bridge and Chess Club
 CHAT Club
 Club Frost

 College Partnership
 Computer Mod Club
 Dance Club
 Debate Club
 Dumbledore's Army (Harry Potter fan club)
 Fashion Club 
 Frost Follies

 Frost Service Club
 Game Zone
 Intramurals
 Legend of Zelda Fan Club
 Mathalicious Club
 MathCounts
 Model United Nations (MUN)

 Peer mediation
 Peer tutoring
 Pokémon Club
 Rugby Club
 Science Olympiad
 Soccer Club
 Student Council Association (SCA)
 Technology Student Association (TSA)

All students at Frost are required to do community service (Service Learning Project) each quarter. Seventh graders must complete a number of hours for the school year, and eighth graders must complete 15–20 hours for the school year. Several teachers provide things for the students to do, and students may also choose to volunteer at a homeless shelter, soup kitchen, or similar.

Frost is the site of Capital One's Junior Achievement Finance Park at Fairfax County. Eighth graders from neighboring schools often take field trips here.

In 2007, Supreme Court Justice Antonin Scalia gave a lecture to the Seekers team at Frost. His grandson was a student there at the time. In 2011, Scalia gave another lecture to the Seekers team; his granddaughter was then a student there.

In 2019, Frost started construction on an expansion and renovation of the school. It is expected to be completed in Fall-Winter 2023.

Glasgow Middle School

Glasgow Middle School (Region 2, grades 6–8) is part of the Fairfax County Public School system.  It was named for the novelist Ellen Glasgow.  The school's mascot is the panther.

The majority of the students feed into Justice High School in Falls Church.  A few students feed into other local high schools such as Annandale High School and Falls Church High School.  Students have the option of testing for Thomas Jefferson High School for Science and Technology, and each year less than eleven students are offered admission to TJHSST (as of 2021).

Students at Glasgow participate in the International Baccalaureate Middle Years Program (IBMYP), and work towards earning an International Baccalaureate (IB) diploma in high school. Glasgow also offers a Spanish Immersion program for students who have participated in an elementary school immersion program. Some students place into Glasgow for the immersion programs.

Many students opt to stay after school on Mondays, Wednesdays, and Thursdays to participate in extracurricular activities. They participate in various academic teams such as Girls Engineering in Math and Science (GEMS), Science Olympiad, and Math Counts. NJHS (National Junior Honor Society), a service club, is also available, but only for the eighth grade. Various sports and games clubs are available. Students who demonstrate leadership skills and creativity can also run for the Student Government Association (SGA), which decides upcoming events for the school. Elections for representatives take place at the beginning of the year, while elections for officers, such as president, vice president, secretary, or treasurer, take place at the end of the year, for the following year.

On January 29, 2008, Glasgow students moved to a new building, built behind the old one. It was originally scheduled to be moved into during winter break, but it was changed until after the second grading quarter ended.

Hayfield Secondary School

Hayfield Secondary School is a secondary school, meaning it serves grades 7 through 12, but the high school and middle school students are generally kept segregated. The middle school has an honors (formally GT) program, and the high school offers both honors and Advanced Placement courses.

As of the spring of 2007, the number of exams on which a score of 3 or higher was achieved (on a scale of 1–5) rose to 57% from 46% the previous year, the best results found on record for Hayfield.

Herndon Middle School

Herndon Middle School (Region 1, grades 7–8) is in Herndon. It feeds into Herndon High School.

The school has eight academic teams.

As of the 2018–2019 school year, the school uses an odd-even schedule in which students go to even periods one day and odd the next, making each class 90 minutes. Students can choose from a variety of electives to complement their core classes.

The school offers several levels of classes including Honors Geometry, Honors Algebra, French, Spanish,  Tech Education ("Shop"), art, and music education.

In 1995 the Herndon Middle School Band, under the direction of Noreen Liennemann, won the prestigious Sudler Cup, presented by the John Philip Sousa Foundation to honor middle school concert bands that have demonstrated high standards of excellence over a period of years.

It was constructed in 1952, and renovations have been made due to the growing population of the community. It includes a historic Cold War-era fallout shelter.

Oliver Wendell Holmes Middle School

Oliver Wendell Holmes Middle School (Region 2, grades 6–8), also known as Holmes Middle School, is a public school with an Alexandria address but is outside of the city limits. It is part of the Fairfax County Public Schools system. It is named after the poet Oliver Wendell Holmes Sr. The current principal is Margaret Barnes.

Holmes' 2014–15 student body of 956 was 20.5% African American, 19% White, 20% Asian, 37% Hispanic, and 2.6% other.

Holmes Middle School was founded in 1966. In 1991, additional construction was started. In 2004, a new front area of the building was constructed including a new media center, office, and guidance office. That same year, Holmes became a member of the International Baccalaureate Middle Years Program.

North Springfield Elementary School (Springfield address), Weyanoke Elementary School (Alexandria address), Columbia Elementary School, Parklawn Elementary School and Bren Mar Park Elementary (Alexandria address) feed into Holmes.

Holmes' students move on to Annandale High School in Fairfax County's Annandale community or Edison High School (Alexandria address). A few students attend Thomas Jefferson High School for Science and Technology, a magnet school with an Alexandria address.

Langston Hughes Middle School

Langston Hughes Middle School (Region 1, grades 7–8), named for the African-American poet Langston Hughes, is a public school in Reston in unincorporated Fairfax County.  The principal is Aimee Monticchio.

The school was established in 1979 as Langston Hughes Intermediate School and shared a building with South Lakes High School for its first year and part of the second. The mascot is the panther, and the school colors are navy blue and grey.

The school is built on the same floor plan as Rocky Run Middle School (before Rocky Run was renovated) and feeds into South Lakes High School for grades 9–12. It is an International Baccalaureate Middle Years Program school, which is intended to precede South Lakes's IB curriculum, and is also part of the "Model Campus" of South Lakes and Terraset Elementary school. The three schools share the track and fields.

Elementary schools that feed into Langston Hughes Middle School are Terraset, Sunrise Valley, Forest Edge, Lake Anne, Dogwood, Hunters Woods, and students transfer from nearby Crossfield, Armstrong, Aldrin, Clearview, Dranesville, Herndon, and Hutchison.

In 1998, a student-run prostitution ring was discovered at the middle school, leading to a police investigation. In March, a 13-year-old boy was convicted for organizing a sex-for-hire ring that involved a half dozen of his female classmates.

A music video for a song named "Eastside" by Benny Blanco, Halsey, and Khalid released in 2018 with over 500 million views was partially filmed at the Langston Hughes campus, due to Benny Blanco's relations with the school.

Washington Irving Middle School

Washington Irving Middle School (Region 4, grades 7–8) is a public school located in Springfield. It feeds into West Springfield High School. Elementary schools that feed into Washington Irving Middle School include Cardinal Forest, Hunt Valley, Keene Mill, Orange Hunt, and Rolling Valley, Sangster, and West Springfield.

Irving is divided into eight teams: four seventh grade (yellow, green, orange, and blue) and four eighth grade (purple, black, white, and red). The team names switch every year. All the members on each team have the same teachers for their core classes: Science, English, Math, and History/Civics.

Luther Jackson Middle School

Luther Jackson Middle School (Region 2, grades 7–8), located southwest of Falls Church, is one of 26 public middle schools in the county. It opened in 1954 as Luther Jackson High School, the first all-black high school in Fairfax County. This gave Virginia African-American students a closer option than schools in Washington, D.C.

In 1965, when the county was integrated, the school was designated as Luther Jackson Intermediate School, which eventually changed to Luther Jackson Middle School.  The school is named after Dr. Luther Porter Jackson an established historian and educator. The mascot is a tiger and the school colors are red and black/white.

The school has transitioned into a GT Center school to reduce overcrowding at Joyce Kilmer Middle School and Robert Frost Middle School. The school converted into an AAP center school.

The AAP center was an option for certain students zoned for either Jackson or Thoreau had a choice to go to Jackson Middle School or for the AAP center or Thoreau. In 2018, when redistricting occurred, kids zoned for Jackson Middle School as their base school were moved to Thoreau Middle School as their base school and had the option of still attending Jackson if they wanted the AAP center. As a result, Jackson used to have 3 high school feeders, Oakton High School, Madison High School or Falls Church High School. 
 
Luther Jackson Middle School has a strong and growing drama department led by Stacey Jones, and has a strong music department. The 2013 musical was Willy Wonka and the 2014 musical was Mulan.

Katherine Johnson Middle School

Katherine Johnson Middle School (Region 5, grades 7-8) is a City of Fairfax and Fairfax County Public Schools AAP (FCPS Advanced Academics Program) Center-based middle school serving grades 7-8 in Region 5. The school is owned by the City of Fairfax, but implements Fairfax County Public Schools' "educational services, staffing, transportation, and food services." 

NASA research mathematician Katherine Johnson is the school's namesake. Until 2021, the school was named for American poet and Confederate soldier Sidney Lanier. KJMS's principal is Tammara Silipigni. Many students who KJMS move on to Fairfax High School. It is fed by Willow Springs, Daniels Run, Providence, Colin Powell, Greenbriar East students who do not live in the Greenbriar subdivision, Eagle View, and Mosaic Elementary Schools.

The school has eight teams in total; for 7th grade: Patriots, Captains, Spartans and Hokies; and for 8th Grade: Highlanders, Nighthawks, Panthers, and Cavaliers. Each team is named after a Virginia College mascot. KJMS's mascot is the eagle.

The school has four orchestras and four band programs.

Francis Scott Key Middle School

Francis Scott Key Middle School (Region 3, grades 7–8) is a public school in Springfield which feeds into John R. Lewis High School.

Key's 2014–2015 student body of 887 was 40.92% Hispanic, 24.13% Asian, 17.93% White, 12.85% Black, and 4.17% other.

A total of 41% of teachers have a bachelor's degree, 59% have a master's degree, and less than 1% have a doctorate degree. The school has a 96% attendance rate.

There are six teams at Key: three in the seventh grade (7A – The Adventurers, 7B – The Bulldogs, 7C – The Champs), and three in the eighth grade.

Joyce Kilmer Middle School

Joyce Kilmer Middle School (Region 2, grades 7–8) is a public school named after the journalist and poet Joyce Kilmer.

The school feeds into James Madison High School, Oakton High School, George C. Marshall High School, Langley High School, McLean High School, and also (has the possibility) Thomas Jefferson High School for Science and Technology.

Kilmer has a GT program for students who have been determined to be "Gifted and Talented".

The school offers many electives for 7th and 8th graders, including Family And Consumer Sciences (Home EC), Drama, Tech Tools, Inventions and Innovations, Technological Systems, and Advanced Technology Tools.

Kilmer is also known for its outstanding band and orchestra program. Under the direction of conductor Sharon Bonneau, the Kilmer Symphonic band has been recognized as one of the best middle school bands in the state. The Kilmer Symphonic Orchestra, led by conductor Elizabeth Fogel and previously led by Marci Swift, has been recognized as one of the best middle school orchestras in the state. The school also has a chorus and string orchestra. The strings program offers violin, viola, cello, and bass.

48% of the teachers have a bachelor's degrees, and 52% have master's degrees. There are 19.5 students per teacher. There is a 97% attendance rate.

Kilmer's student body of 1100-1200 as of 2021 is 60% White, 21% Asian, 10% Hispanic, 5% unspecified, 4% Black, and less than 1% Native American.

No contact rule controversy
In June 2007, Kilmer Middle School, a school in the FCPS system, attracted national controversy after a 13-year-old student was reprimanded for putting his arm around his girlfriend during a break. The school had a strict policy of "no physical contact", meaning that contact such as high fives or hugs between friends are not allowed. Despite opposition from some parents and students, and coverage on Fox News, CNN, Time Magazine and the Washington Post, the school system and the former principal of the school, Deborah Strayhorn, stood behind the rule and refused to rescind it.

Lake Braddock Secondary School

Lake Braddock Secondary School is a combined junior high and high school in Burke administered by Fairfax County Public Schools. It is one of three secondary schools in Fairfax County, the other two being Hayfield Secondary School and Robinson Secondary School. Opened in 1973, Lake Braddock has recently completed an extensive renovation project. Its mascot is the bruin bear, and the school colors are purple and gold.

Liberty Middle School

Liberty Middle School (Region 4, grades 7–8) is one of the feeder middle schools for Centreville High School. They are located on the same road, less than two miles apart.

The school requires four core classes (Math, Science, History, and English) and P.E. for each student. Students can choose 2–4 electives (2 full year electives or 1 full year and 2 half semester electives or 4 half semester electives). However, some electives are only for a semester or quarter instead of a full year, in which case a student may take more electives.

Of 1100+ students (2006–2007), 77% were White, 3% were Black, 13% were Asian, and 7% were Hispanic. 

The school has eight teams; in 7th grade there are the Patriots, Pride, Navigators, and All Stars; and in 8th grade there are the Rockets, Wizards, Eagles, and Comets.

Henry Wadsworth Longfellow Middle School

Henry Wadsworth Longfellow Middle School (Region 2, grades 7–8), north of Falls Church, is a public school named after the poet Henry Wadsworth Longfellow. The school's mascot is the Lancer.

It is a two-story building with two gymnasiums, a cafeteria, and a lecture hall. It also has a small basement and a two-room "mini mod." The school has completed major renovations, including the addition of a new wing.

Carole Kihm became principal on May 19, 2008 and was named the 2014 Outstanding Middle School Principal of Virginia by the Virginia Association of Secondary School Principals.

The student body in 2018–2019 had 1848 students and was 27% Asian, 51% White, 12% Hispanic or Latino, 3% Black, and 7% other, with a total student body of 1319 (659 7th graders and 660 8th graders).

Elementary schools that feed into Longfellow include Chesterbrook, Haycock, Kent Gardens, Franklin Sherman, and Timberlane. Additionally, some students come from Lemon Road, Westgate, Spring Hill, Colvin Run, and Churchill Road Elementary schools. Most of Longfellow's students go on to enroll at McLean High School, but some attend Langley High School, Marshall High School, or Thomas Jefferson High School for Science and Technology. In order to attend Thomas Jefferson, students undergo an application process that begins in students' eighth grade year, as it is a magnet school. In past years Longfellow has been a large contributor to the Thomas Jefferson population.

Longfellow Middle offers classes for the average student, such as Science, Mathematics, and History, and also classes for those students who require higher-level education, such as Math Honors, both levels of Algebra, Geometry, Science Honors, and History Honors.

Longfellow Middle also provides classes for the mentally disabled, and has an entire after-school club devoted to entertaining these students, "Good Buddies".

Longfellow Middle also provides extra classes like Technology Education (referred to as "Shop" by students), where students learn the basics of using power tools to construct different types of objects; Home Education, where students learn basic home skills like cooking, sewing, and ironing laundry; and Journalism, where students are taught how to create newspaper articles and then publish them in the school's quarterly newspaper, the Longfellow Lead.

Longfellow Middle teaches five award-winning bands, Beginner Band, Cadet Band, Concert Band, Wind Ensemble, and Symphonic Band. Beginner is a class for beginning musicians and Symphonic is for musicians with at least two years of experience. The Wind Ensemble, Concert Band, and Symphonic Band regularly compete in annual competitions at Busch Gardens Williamsburg Amusement Park and Kings Dominion Amusement Park. At these competitions the musicians play pieces of music while a panel of judges critiques their sound and style. The Longfellow Bands have won several awards in these competitions, and in June 2017 the Wind Ensemble, Concert Band, and Symphonic Band received 1st-place accolades at the Busch Gardens competition. At the annual District Assessment, the Longfellow Symphonic band has consistently received a rating of I (Superior). Longfellow's orchestra program is also renowned, with Longfellow's Chamber orchestra winning the Middle School Division at the 2012 National Orchestra Festival in Atlanta in addition to the many awards it has received at Busch Gardens Williamsburg Amusement Park. With 250 students enrolled in an orchestra class in 2018, it is one of the most popular electives at the school, offering places in the Cadet Orchestra (Beginning-Intermediate), String Ensemble (Intermediate), Concert Orchestra (Advanced-Intermediate), Symphonic Orchestra (Intermediate-Advanced), and Chamber Orchestra (Most Advanced). Students must audition for places in each of the intermediate and higher orchestras. The Concert, Symphonic, and Chamber orchestras have regularly received I (Superior) ratings at the District Assessments. In 2018, the Longfellow Chamber Orchestra was invited to perform at the Midwest Clinic in Chicago, Illinois as one of only three middle schools worldwide attending that year. It also marked the first time in 12 years that an FCPS (K-12) performing group was invited to the Clinic and 30 years since the last time a string orchestra group was selected to perform. The Longfellow Orchestra program is currently under the direction of Jacqueline Robertson.

The school has two gymnasiums, two playing fields, a basketball court, and a quarter mile gravel track, as well as a library, a lecture hall, and a Black Box theater.

After-school activities at Longfellow include basketball, Improv, Tennis, Quiz Bowl, Debate, Art/Clay Club, Battle of the Books, Homework Club, Creative Writing Club, Math Counts, Science Bowl, Science Olympiad, and Science Olympiad as of March 2023. The Longfellow Knowledge Masters team has been ranked as one of the top teams in the entire country and has received several first-place awards. The Science Bowl and Quiz Bowl team both took second in 2012 at each respective national tournament, while its History Bowl team won first place. In 2012, Tajin Rogers from Longfellow won the first-ever National History Bee, which was televised. Its 2017 Science Olympiad team finished 6th in the country, the highest placing of any Virginia Science Olympiad team at the national competition. The school has won many awards in mathematics and science. The school is also nationally ranked for its math department. 

On March 13, 2008, Margaret Spellings, the United States Secretary of Education, visited the school to publish a review of the math education in the United States and to get rid of "fuzzy math".

In early 2009, Longfellow Middle School introduced a new academic activity called "Lancer Time," a 23-minute period at the end of the day, intended to give students time to get help from their teachers without having to stay after school. Students can also work on homework and projects from other classes. The period is also used one day a week to teach the students about values such as honesty and leadership, as well as introducing better study habits to help students prepare for their exams. Other classes, as well as hall passing time, were shortened to account for the new period.

All Fairfax County Public Schools require students, beginning in third grade, to take an end-of-year exam known as the Standards of Learning test, or SOL, that covers the content learned during the school year.

School begins at 7:30 AM and ends at 2:15 PM.

Longfellow is one of the top feeder schools into the Thomas Jefferson High School for Science and Technology (TJHSST), often with 60 or more representatives in the freshman class.

Longfellow Middle School has been honored with the Governor's Award for Excellence in Education from 2010 through 2018. The school was also awarded the Virginia Board of Education Excellence Award in 2013.

The middle school also has a known tradition through the students called "sevie-bop day"

Edgar Allan Poe Middle School

Edgar Allan Poe Middle School (Region 2, grades 6–8) is named after author Edgar Allan Poe. Its mascot is the raven. Jason Pannutti is the principal.

Most students feed into Annandale High School, Justice High School or Falls Church High School. A select few also test into Thomas Jefferson High School for Science and Technology.

Poe's 881 students during the 2014–2015 school year were 49.04% Hispanic, 12.26% White, 24.29% Asian, 12.26% Black, and 2.16% unspecified. During the same school year, 71.96% of the student body received free/reduced-priced meals and 34.73% were classified as having limited English.

James W. Robinson, Jr. Secondary School

James W. Robinson, Jr. Secondary School, the largest school in the Commonwealth of Virginia, includes a middle school (grades 7–8) and a high school (grades 9–12), was named after Medal of Honor recipient James W. Robinson, Jr.

Robinson opened in September 1971, taking its students from Oakton High School, Wilbert Tucker Woodson High School, West Springfield High School and Fairfax High School. It was the second of Fairfax County's large "superschools," or secondary schools, which housed grades 7–12. Robinson's chief rival to the east, Lake Braddock, which opened in 1973, was the third of these schools from this era, the first of which was Hayfield, near Mount Vernon, which opened in 1969. The most recent addition to the series of secondary schools is South County in Lorton, which opened in 2005, taking its students from former Hayfield territory. With the opening of South County Middle School, the high school has since adopted "South County High School" as its official name.

Rocky Run Middle School

Rocky Run Middle School (Region 5, grades 7–8) accommodates 1316 students as of June 2018. It is named after a creek that runs through the nearby neighborhood.

Rocky Run is an AAP (FCPS Advanced Academics Program) middle school fed by Greenbriar East elementary school graduates who live in the Greenbriar subdivision, some Brookfield Elementary School students, Greenbriar West AAP students who live in the Greenbriar subdivision, and Poplar Tree Elementary School graduates.. The school primarily feeds into Chantilly HS. However, some students also attend Centreville, Fairfax, Westfield and Robinson High Schools due in part to "overcapacity" issues at Chantilly High School. Rocky Run Middle School is on the corner of Poplar Tree Road and Stringfellow Road, the latter of which has been recently widened.

There are ten teams at Rocky Run, five per grade. On the seventh grade side, there are the Stars, Patriots, Capitals, Spirit, and Nationals. On the eighth grade side, there are Liberty, Trailblazers, Eagles, United, and Freedom.

In 2018, Fairfax County commenced a $47.6 million renovation of Rocky Run, which temporarily closed several classrooms. To accommodate the temporary displacement, FCPS built a set of trailers called Ramsville, placing them on the back blacktop of the school. Ramsville has since been removed. Ramsville was composed of 7 big trailers with 4 rooms each, 1 smaller trailer with 2 rooms, and a bathroom trailer.  This renovation added a two-floor addition and completely revamped the front of the school.

Carl Sandburg Middle School

Carl Sandburg Middle School (Region 3, grades 7–8), named after poet Carl Sandburg, is located south of Alexandria. In 1985, Fort Hunt High School was renamed Carl Sandburg Middle School.

South County Middle School

South County Middle School is located in Lorton. It opened in September 2012 on a 40-acre site as a stand-alone middle school with a capacity of 1,350 students.

From 2005 to June 2012, 7th and 8th grade students were enrolled at South County Secondary School (now South County High School), which housed both middle and high school programs.

The school mascot is the mustang, and the school colors are green, blue, and burgundy.

Ormond Stone Middle School

Ormond Stone Middle School (Region 5, grades 7–8) is located in Centreville.

The school is named after astronomer, mathematician, and educator Ormond Stone. Stone opened in opened its doors in 1991.

The principal of Stone Middle School is Sonya Williams. She has been in the role since 2022.

Henry David Thoreau Middle School

Henry David Thoreau Middle School (Region 1, grades 7–8), is located east of Vienna. It opened in 1960.

Thoreau is a feeder school for James Madison High School, George C. Marshall High School and Oakton High School. Because of the 2008 redistricting in Fairfax County, some of Thoreau's students (who previously lived in the James Madison High School district) were redistricted to Hughes Middle School and South Lakes High School. In 2018, due to new redistricting, some students were redistricted from Jackson Middle School to Thoreau Middle School.

The principal is Teresa Khuluki.

Thoreau offers several advanced classes, including French 1, Spanish 1, Algebra 1, and Geometry. Thoreau's electives include Drama, Inventions and Innovations, Computer Solutions, Advanced Computer Solutions, Personal Development, Basic Skills, Family and Consumer Sciences, and Art. Students in both 7th and 8th grade are able to take honors classes for all core classes (foreign language is not included). Spanish and French are options.

Mark Twain Middle School

 
Mark Twain Middle School (Region 3, grades 7–8), is located south of Alexandria. It feeds into Thomas A. Edison High School. The school has 837 students. The school is named after the writer Mark Twain.

Twain students are assigned to teams of approximately 125. Each team is coordinated by the four core teachers (from English, mathematics, science and social studies), a school counselor and an administrator. They are the Panthers, Patriots, Pirates, Cavaliers, Wolverines, Eagles, Hawks, and Lancers.

Mark Twain Middle offers the Gifted and Talented program, Special Education program, and ESOL.

As of June 2005, the school's racial/ethnic breakdown was 15% Asian, 18% black, 22% Hispanic, 40% white, and 5% other.

Walt Whitman Middle School

Walt Whitman Middle School (Region 3, grades 7–8) is located in Alexandria. It primarily feeds into Mount Vernon High School. The school is named after the poet Walt Whitman. Its mascot is the wildcat.

Walt Whitman Middle School and Mount Vernon High School received a $1.25 million STEM (Science, Technology, Energy, and Mathematics) grant to provide the resources to promote critical thinking in science, technology, engineering, mathematics, English, reading, the arts, and history.

References

Middle schools in Virginia
Schools in Fairfax County, Virginia
Fairfax
Fairfax County